Susan L. Rahr is an American law enforcement officer who served as the Sheriff of King County, Washington from 2005 to 2012.

Early life and education 
Rahr was born in Laramie, Wyoming and raised in Bellevue, Washington. Rahr earned a Bachelor of Arts degree in Criminal Justice from Washington State University, graduating cum laude. She also attended the National Sheriff’s Institute and Federal Bureau of Investigation National Executive Institute.

Career 
Rahr began her career with the King County Sheriff's Office in 1979. Rahr initially intended on working as a police officer until she had enough money for law school, but later decided against it. Following her promotion to sergeant, she became a patrol supervisor and worked in the Burglary/Larceny, Proactive, Criminal Warrants, and Special Assault Units. Six years later, she was promoted to operations captain. She later served as the commander of the Internal Investigations and Gang Units, and the Special Investigations Section. She was promoted to major of in 1997, and was selected to be the police chief for Shoreline in 1998. She was Chief of the Sheriff's Office Field Operations Division for 4.5 years before being appointed by outgoing Sheriff Dave Reichert after he was elected to the United States House of Representatives. The first woman to hold the position, Rahr was elected sheriff in November 2005. She ran, unopposed for re-election on November 3, 2009, and received 97.45% of the vote.

On March 31, 2012, Rahr resigned to serve as the Executive Director of the Washington State Criminal Justice Training Commission. She appointed Chief Deputy Steve Strachan to fill the position until a new sheriff was elected. Rahr also serves on the Advisory Board of Central Washington University’s Law and Justice Department.

References

External links

Year of birth missing (living people)
Living people
Washington (state) sheriffs
American deputy sheriffs
Women sheriffs
People from Bellevue, Washington
American women police officers
21st-century American women